Dregen (born Andreas Tyrone Svensson; 12 June 1973) is a Swedish musician best known as the guitarist of The Hellacopters, as well as Backyard Babies. As of March 2014, Dregen has also served as the newest member of Michael Monroe's solo band, replacing Ginger as guitarist. He was formerly married to fellow Swedish singer Pernilla Andersson, who is also the mother of their first child, a son named Sixten. The couple officially announced their separation on 1 June 2015.

He is a founding member of Backyard Babies, who he helped form in 1987. The band announced the start of an indefinite hiatus beginning in 2010. In a 2011 interview with Rocksverige.se, Dregen mentioned the band would eventually come together and be stronger than ever in response to rumours surrounding the band's still ongoing hiatus. During this hiatus, Dregen released a personal autobiography, followed by his first solo record in September 2013. Then, after a 5-year absence, Backyard Babies returned in 2015, going on to release Four By Four later that summer. Its release marked the band's first album in 7 years.

History 
Dregen formed the Backyard Babies with his childhood friends Nicke Borg, Peder Carlsson and Johan Blomqvist in their own town of Nässjö, Sweden. The band moved to Stockholm to pursue wider success. The group signed a record deal and released their debut album Diesel & Power in 1994.

Also in 1994, Dregen met singer and guitarist Nicke Andersson who at that time played drums with Swedish death metal outfit Entombed. Together they formed another band, The Hellacopters. The Hellacopters found success in 1996 with their album Supershitty to the Max!, which won a Grammis. It was followed in 1997 by the record Payin' the Dues. The band also toured with KISS. That same year, Backyard Babies released another Grammis winning album – Total 13.

By the end of the 1990s, Dregen decided to leave The Hellacopters and subsequently focused on recording and performing with Backyard Babies.

The album Making Enemies is Good was released in 2001, and Backyard Babies were awarded another Grammis.  They toured the world several times and even did a European tour opening up for AC/DC. Since then, the band have released a number of EPs, singles and albums such as Stockholm Syndrome, People Like People Like People Like Us, Backyard Babies and Them XX. The latter resulted in an anniversary tour in 2010, following which the band announced an indefinite hiatus.

In May 2011 Dregen also joined Michael Monroe, from former band Hanoi Rocks. Monroe, writing on his website, said

As of July 2011, Dregen was working on his first solo album. It was released on 25 September 2013 as Dregen.

Musical equipment 

Guitars
Gibson ES-335 – Goldtop finish and Classic 57 bridge and neck pickups.
Gibson ES-335 – Cream white finish, Lundgren bridge pickup and Classic 57 neck pickup.
Gibson ES-335 – Black finish, DiMarzio Super Distortion bridge pickup and Classic 57 neck pickup.
Sundberg S-J2 acoustic – Luthier built with custom skull inlays.

Effects
Jim Dunlop Cry Baby
MXR MC-401 Boost

Amplifiers
Fender Super Sonic Heads through 4x12" Fender cabinets – Used live since 2009.
Fender Bassman Heads modified by Tommy Folkesson through 4x12 Marshall cabinets – Used live until 2009.
Fender Prosonic – Used during later studio recordings.

Selected discography 

1994 Backyard Babies – Diesel & Power (Guitar, backing vocals)
1996 The Hellacopters – Supershitty to the Max! (Guitar, vocals)
1997 The Hellacopters – Payin' the Dues (Guitar, backing vocals)
1997 Backyard Babies – Total 13 (Guitar, backing vocals)
1999 Supershit 666 – Supershit666 (Guitar, vocals)
2001 Backyard Babies – Making Enemies Is Good (Guitar, backing vocals)
2001 Infinite Mass – Bullet (Guitar)
2003 Backyard Babies – Stockholm Syndrome (Guitar, backing vocals)
2003 Wilmer X – Lyckliga Hundar (Guitar, backing vocals)
2004 Kurt-Sunes Med Helveteshundarna – (Komma Ut Ur Machen) Nu! (Guitar)
2004 Dregen and Tyla – The Poet & The Dragon (Guitar)
2004 Urrke T & Midlife Crisis – Ask Not What You Can Do for Your Country... (Guitar)
2006 Backyard Babies – People Like People Like People Like Us (Guitar, backing vocals)
2008 Backyard Babies – Backyard Babies (Guitar, backing vocals)
2008 Timbuktu – Tack för kaffet (Guitar, vocals)
2010 Imperial State Electric – Imperial State Electric (Guitar, backing vocals)
2011 Märvel – Warhawks Of War (Guest guitar)
2013 Dregen – Dregen (Guitar, vocals)
2013 Michael Monroe – Horns and Halos (Guitar, backing vocals)
2015 Backyard Babies – Four By Four (Guitar, backing vocals)
2022 The Hellacopters – Eyes Of Oblivion (Guitar, backing vocals)

References

External links 
Official website

1973 births
Living people
People from Nässjö Municipality
Swedish rock guitarists
Swedish rock musicians
21st-century guitarists
The Hellacopters members
Backyard Babies members